The Supreme Court of Ghana is the highest judicial body in Ghana.  Ghana's 1992 constitution guarantees the independence and separation of the Judiciary from the Legislative and the Executive arms of government.

History

The Supreme Court was established by the Supreme Court Ordinance (1876) as the highest tribunal in the Gold Coast (now Ghana) during the colonial era. Appeals from the Supreme Court of the Gold Coast went to the West African Court of Appeal (WACA) established in 1866. Ghana withdrew from WACA following independence, then abolished appeals to the Judicial Committee of the Privy Council in London in 1960. After the military coup d'état of February 24, 1966, the National Liberation Council (NLC), by the Courts Decree, 1966 (NLCD.84) abolished the Supreme Court and vested judicial power in two sets of courts: the Superior Court of Judicature and the inferior courts. This was reversed by Article 102(4) of the 1969 constitution establishing the second republic. After the  coup on January 13, 1972, the Supreme Court was again abolished by the National Redemption Council with the reason that the 1969 constitution had been suspended and so there was no need for a court to "interpret and enforce it". Its functions were transferred to the Court of Appeal. This was again reverted by the 1979 constitution when the third republic was established on September 24, 1979. The Supreme Court was left intact after the December 31, 1981 coup by the Provisional National Defence Council, though it made changes to the court system by introducing public tribunals.

On July 2, 2013 the Supreme Court sentenced the editor-in-chief of the Daily Searchlight newspaper, Ken Kuranchie, to 10 days in prison for calling the 9 Justices hypocritical and selective.

Current status

The 1992 constitution stipulates that the Supreme court is made up of the Chief Justice of Ghana and not less than nine other Justices of the Supreme Court. The Chief Justice is appointed by the President of Ghana acting in consultation with the Council of State and with the approval of the country's Parliament. This must also be with the approval of Parliament. The 1992 Constitution abolished all the public tribunals established under the PNDC and created the Regional Tribunal whose chairman was equated with the High Court judges.

Justices of the Supreme Court

The following is a list of the judges of the Supreme Court. In July 2018, President Nana Akufo-Addo appointed four new judges to the Supreme Court. They were Samuel K. Marful-Sau and Agnes M.A Dordzie, both Justices of the Appeal Court, Nii Ashie Kotey, a former Dean of the Faculty of Law at the University of Ghana and Nene A. O. Amegatcher,  a lawyer in private practice who also a former president of the Ghana Bar Association. One of the longest serving judges of the Court, William Atuguba retired in the same month. He had been on the Supreme Court after being nominated by Jerry Rawlings in November 1995 until July 2018.
The last female Chief Justice was Sophia Akuffo. She was the last Supreme Court Judge appointed by Jerry Rawlings to retire. She retired on 20 December 2019 and was replaced by Kwasi Anin-Yeboah on 7 January 2020.
In December 2019, President Akufo-Addo appointed three new judges to the Supreme Court. They were Mariama Owusu, Lovelace Johnson and Gertrude Tokornoo. They are to replace Sophia Adinyira, Vida Akoto-Bamfo and Sophia Akuffo who have either retired or are due to retire.

Some recently retired Supreme Court Judges

Julius Ansah (July 2004 - 2020)
 Sophia Akuffo (Chief Justice of Ghana 2017-2019) - 30 November 1995 - 20 December 2019
 George Kingsley Acquah- (1995-2007)
 Francis Yaonasu Kpegah – (6 January 1993 – 2008) – Once the most senior Judge
 Prof. Tawia Modibo Ocran – (2004–2008)
 Stephen Alan Brobbey - (2002-2012)
 Prof. Samuel Kofi Date-Bah – (2003-2013)
 Mrs Georgina Theodora Wood – (12 November 2002 – June 2017) and Chief Justice between 15 June 2007 and June 2017.
Rose Constance Owusu – (since 11 June 2008 - August 2014
Joseph Bawa Akamba – (11 Nov 2012 to 2017)
William A. Atuguba (30 November 1995 - 1 July 2018)
 Kweku Etrew Amua-Sekyi
Mrs Sophia Ophilia Adjeibea Adinyira (2006 – July 2019)
 Vida Akoto-Bamfo  (October 2009 to February 2019)
 Alfred Anthony Benin (11 November 2012 - January 2020
Nasiru Sulemana Gbadegbe (October 2009 — December 2020)

List of Chief Justices of the Supreme Court

Since its inception in 1876, the Supreme Court has had 27 Chief Justices.

See also

Judiciary of Ghana
Chief Justice of Ghana
General Legal Council

References

External links

Official Website of the Judicial Service of Ghana
Ghana Constitution
Parliament of Ghana Website
GhanaReview.com

Ghana
Judiciary of Ghana
Justices of the Supreme Court of Ghana